"Strange Changes" is a song that was co-written by Lynsey de Paul and Sue Shifrin (Sue Shifrin Cassidy), the former wife of David Cassidy. After signing a worldwide recording contract with MCA Records at the end of 1980, "Strange Changes" was released as a single on 27 April 1981 by de Paul on the MCA label. A promo 12 inch single with an extended version of the song was also released. It also appeared on the 1981 French compilation of hits album, Hot Summer Nights, on the Arabella record label, as well as being released as a single in France. The recording was co-produced by Jon Kelly and de Paul. While the song was not immediately as commercial as many of her other hits, it had a laid back feel ahead of its time that grows on repeated listening. The British DJ and music journalist James Hamilton wrote in the music paper Record Mirror, "MCA’s mystery Fleetwood Mac-sounding ‘Strange Changes’ white label teaser turns out to be by Lynsey De Paul – oh, goodie!", with other sources also noting a similarity to Stevie Nicks.
It subsequently made the UK Airplay action chart as well as the UK disco chart breakers/bubblers listing. Writing on her website, de Paul revealed she wrote this song when she was living in the United States and wanted to come back home to the UK. "It meant leaving behind a life that had taken five years to build and a long term relationship with James Coburn. I literally felt that I was going through a strange change" she said. De Paul performed the song on a number of TV programmes including the German TV series WWF Club, - a DVD of this performance was released on "WWF Club Festival 3". She also performed the song on the second episode of the UK TV music programme Razzamatazz on 9 June 1981. It was included as a track on her Hit Singles album.

The song is still popular and featured on "Beam Me Up" by Albion in 2015, the first song on the "After Midnight" DJ set by Martino Valentino, on the play list of online radio station "Overfitting, The Balearic Mike & Ben Monk show on 1 Brighton FM, Radioactive FM, Tomorrow Land on PBS106.7 FM,  Ginea Radio, The Melbourne radio program Noise in My Head as well as being listed as the number 1 hit on the old skool chart at WahWah45 in November 2016. It was also featured as track 9 on Good Vibes 61 - mixed by Dr.T on Brown Fat in 2018, on NTS Radio on the program "Getting Warmer". and on "OnlyJams" radio show in 2021.

A remixed and extended version, entitled "Stranger Changes", was released by Gentle Hands (aka Stellar Well's Jake Goldsmith) in September 2016 on La.Ga.Sta. Late Summer Compilation Vol.6, featuring De Paul's original vocals. This version has been playlisted by Tom Ravenscroft on BBC Radio 6, Beats in Space Radio, and most recently KALX, Berkeley. It was ranked #7 in the "Lagasta" top 50 Songs. A remixed of the song by DJ Duckcomb (in his words "an edit of an impossibly rare white label 12" extended mix of this AOR balearic disco classic tune") was released in 2021, and it also received radio plays in the US. It is scheduled for release on 27 May 2022 on the Everything You're About To Hear Is True label as "Paul Strange", with a pre-review stating "..a supremely slinky rub down of Lynsey De Paul's 1981 disco funk masterpiece 'Strange Changes'". It reached #3 on Juno's soul chart.

References

1981 singles
MCA Records singles
Lynsey de Paul songs
Songs written by Lynsey de Paul